Boia may refer to:
Boia, a village in Jupânești municipality, Romania
Boia (Laconia), a town in ancient Laconia, Greece
Lucian Boia, Romanian historian